Andy Adler is a bilingual sportscaster, journalist, and television personality who serves as a sports anchor at CBS 11 (KTVT) and co-host of the Dallas Cowboys pre- and post-game shows for CBS. Adler was previously at WPIX in New York and hosted PIX 11 Sports Desk, as well as the New York Yankees pre-game shows. She was previously a co-anchor of KNBC's Today in LA weekend edition and co-host of the Los Angeles Lakers pre-game, halftime, and post-game shows on Time Warner Cable SportsNet LA. Prior to that, she was a sports anchor for Fox in New York, WNYW.

Career

Early work 

Immediately following graduation from Stanford University, Adler knew she wanted to be a journalist, but did not know anyone in the industry. She applied to the NBC Page program in Burbank, California, and was admitted. She quickly moved up from giving tours of the NBC Lot to working in the KNBC news room as an editors assistant. Two months later, Adler got her first job on-air as a reporter for the NBC affiliate in Monterey, California, for one year.

While at NBC, Adler made an appearance on the NBC affiliate in San Francisco at the age of 20. Following that, she co-hosted the entertainment show Eye On The Desert for the CBS affiliate in Palm Springs. Simultaneously, she began hosting American Latino TV, a nationally syndicated, weekly magazine program focusing on American and foreign-born Latinos making a positive impact in American society.

Fox New York 

Adler began working at WNYW (Fox 5 New York) in 2007 as the weekend evening sports anchor and fill-in host of Good Day New York. She was also the co-host of Sports Extra. She served as the field reporter for the New York Giants' pre-game and post-game shows at the station. She covered the Giants' remarkable run and subsequent win of Super Bowl 42, serving as the field reporter on location. Adler was also the traveling reporter for the New York Jets games airing on MY9 (sister station of WNYW).

While at Fox, Adler covered the Yankees' 2009 World Series Championship, the MLB All Star Game, and served as the host for the New York City Triathlon in 2008 and 2009. She also made appearances on the Fox Business Network. While in New York, Adler hosted Brazilian Day in front of an audience surpassing one million people, stretching across 6th Avenue and 42nd street to Central Park. She left Fox 5 in March 2010.

NBC LA (KNBC) and Los Angeles Lakers 
In March 2010, it was announced that Adler was leaving WNYW to join KNBC in Los Angeles as Today in LA weekend co-anchor and weekday news reporter. She also hosted the weekly sports segment for Prime Time News LA. Adler also made appearances on MSNBC. She also hosted the Lakers pre-game, halftime, and post-game shows for the 2012–2013 season on Time Warner Cable SportsNet LA. She hosted the shows with former NBA players James Worthy, Robert Horry, and Kurt Rambis. Adler also hosted Access SportsNet, a nightly, live, hour show dedicated to sports in Southern California.

CW New York (WPIX, Pix11 News) 
In March, 2014, it was announced that Adler was returning to New York as the sports anchor for Pix 11 News. She also served as host for PIX 11 Sports Desk. During her time at Pix 11, Adler has landed exclusive interviews with Magic Johnson, Alex Rodriguez, Keith Hernandez, and Eli Manning. She also was host of the Yankees pre-game shows airing on the network.

Personal life 
Adler made her film debut with a cameo appearance in Fast Five starring the Dwayne 'The Rock' Johnson. She is a native Spanish speaker and a member of Mensa.

Adler works with The World of Children's Award. She served as host of their inaugural golf fundraiser honoring the New York Giants Steve Weatherford. Adler also works with the Children's Health Fund. She presented at the charity's annual fundraiser with actress Julianne Moore and journalist Jane Pauley.

References

External links
 
 PIX11 Bio Page

Living people
Stanford University alumni
American women journalists
Journalists from California
People from San Diego
1981 births
21st-century American women